Dadić is a Croatian surname. Notable people with the surname include:

Edi Dadić (born 1993), Croatian cross country skier
Ivan Dadić (born 1944), Croatian academic
Ivona Dadic (born 1993), Austrian heptathlete of Croatian descent
Mijo Dadić (born 1981), Croatian footballer
Pavo Dadić (born 1969), Bosnian footballer

Croatian surnames
Slavic-language surnames
Patronymic surnames